Elliot Bath (born 10 February 1992) is an English cricketer. He played one first-class match for Cambridge University Cricket Club in 2014.

See also
 List of Cambridge University Cricket Club players

References

External links
 

1992 births
Living people
English cricketers
Cambridge University cricketers
Cricketers from Winchester
Alumni of Trinity Hall, Cambridge